Frank Hauser may refer to:
 Frank Hauser (American football)
 Frank Hauser (director)